The , or faceless ghost, is a Japanese yōkai that looks like a human but has no face. They are sometimes mistakenly referred to as a mujina, an old Japanese word for a badger or raccoon dog. Although the mujina can assume the form of the other, noppera-bō are usually disguised as humans. Such creatures were thought to sometimes transform themselves into noppera-bō in order to frighten humans. Lafcadio Hearn used the animals' name as the title of his story about faceless monsters, probably resulting in the misused terminology.

Noppera-bō are known primarily for frightening humans, but are usually otherwise harmless. They appear at first as ordinary human beings, sometimes impersonating someone familiar to the victim, before causing their features to disappear, leaving a blank, smooth sheet of skin where their face should be.

In legends
Often, a noppera-bō would not actually exist, but was the disguise of a mujina, a fox kitsune, or a tanuki. In Showa 4 (1767), in the kaidan collection Shinsetsu Hyakumonogatari, there were stories that told of how in Nijugawara in Kyoto (near the Nijo-ohashi bridge in the Nakagyō-ku, Kyoto), a monster called noppera-bō appeared and those that were attacked by it would have several thick hairs attached to their clothing, indicating that it was the disguise of some kind of animal. However, sometimes their real identity is not known, and in the Kanbun 3 (1663) kaidan collection Sorori Monogatari, it was written that in the Oike-cho of the capital (now Nakagyō-ku, Kyoto), there appeared a noppera-bō with a height of about 7 shaku (about 2.1 meters), but nothing was written about what its true identity was. They are also said to appear in folktales in the Osaka Prefecture and Kotonami, Nakatado District, Kagawa Prefecture among other places.

The Noppera-bō and the Koi Pond
This tale recounts a lazy fisherman who decided to fish in the imperial koi ponds near the Heian-kyō palace. Despite being warned by his wife about the pond being sacred and near a graveyard, the fisherman went anyway.  On his way to the pond, he is warned by another fisherman not to go there, but he again ignores the warning. Once at the spot, he is met by a beautiful young woman who pleads with him not to fish in the pond.  He ignores her and, to his horror, she wipes off her face.  Rushing home to hide, he is confronted by what seems to be his wife, who chastises him for his wickedness before wiping off her facial features as well.

The Mujina of the Akasaka Road
The most famous story of a noppera-bō is "Mujina" in Lafcadio Hearn's book Kwaidan: Stories and Studies of Strange Things. The story tells of a man who, travelling along the Akasaka road to Edo, comes across a young woman in a remote location near Kunizaka hill, crying and forlorn. After he attempts to console the young woman and offer assistance, she turns to face him, startling him with the blank countenance of a faceless ghost. Frightened, the man proceeds down the road for some time, until he comes across a soba vendor. Stopping to relax, the man tells the vendor of his encounter, only to recoil in horror as the soba vendor strokes his face, becoming a noppera-bō himself. It turns out that all of these noppera-bō are really just mujina in disguise.

There are other tales about noppera-bō, from one about a young woman rescued from bandits by a mounted samurai whose face disappears, to the story of a noble heading out for a tryst with a courtesan, only to discover that she is being impersonated by a noppera-bō.

Recent reports
Although most tales of noppera-bō predate the 20th century, there are exceptions, both in Japan itself as well as locations where Japanese have emigrated, most notably the U.S. state of Hawaii.  Among the most recent reports:

 On May 19, 1959, Honolulu Advertiser reporter Bob Krauss reported a sighting of a mujina at the Waialae Drive-In Theatre in Kahala.  Krauss reported that the witness watched a woman combing her hair in the women's restroom, and when the witness came close enough, the mujina turned, revealing her featureless face.  The witness was reported to have been admitted to the hospital for a nervous breakdown.  Noted Hawaiian historian, folklorist, and author Glen Grant, in a 1981 radio interview dismissed the story as rumor, only to be called by someone claiming to be the witness, who gave more details on the event, including the previously unreported detail that the mujina in question had red hair. 
 Grant has also reported on a number of other mujina sightings in Hawaii, from Ewa Beach to Hilo.

See also
 Kuchisake-onna ("Slit Mouth Woman"), a Japanese urban legend about a disfigured woman
 Slender Man, a fictional supernatural character with no facial features
 Spirited Away, a 2001 Japanese animated film featuring a character known as "No-Face"
 Kiyomi Haunterly, a Japanese faceless ghost in Monster High

References

External links
Noppera-bo (No Face) at ScaryForKids
Entry on "nopperabou" at The Obakemono Project
Lafcadio Hearn's story at Monogatari.org
Pierre Wayser's flash video of the mujina story 
webpage regarding the 1959 and 1981 reports of the Waialae Mujina
Discussion of the confusion of terms brought about by the titles of Hearn's stories.

Japanese folklore
Japanese ghosts
Japanese bathroom ghosts
Shapeshifting
Mythic humanoids
Yōkai
Legendary creatures with absent body parts
Mythological monsters